Burnita Shelton Matthews (December 28, 1894 – April 25, 1988) was a United States district judge of the United States District Court for the District of Columbia. She was the first woman appointed to serve on a United States District Court.

Early life and education

Matthews was born Burnita Shelton in Burnell, (an unincorporated community in Claiborne County), Mississippi, on December 28, 1894. Her father was a planter and chancery court judge. She had a brother, John L. Shelton. After attending local schools, she went to the Cincinnati Conservatory of Music, as her father wanted her to be able to support herself by teaching music. Her brother was sent to law school.

During World War I, she moved to Washington, D.C., took the civil service exam, and gained a position at the Veterans Administration. In 1917 she enrolled in the night school of the National University Law School (today the George Washington University Law School). She received a Bachelor of Laws in 1919, a Master of Laws in 1920 and passed the District of Columbia bar exam the same year. She married lawyer Percy A. Matthews.

Career

Matthews met with resistance; she was rejected by male professional lawyers' associations, and the District of Columbia Bar Association returned her application and check for dues. Matthews and other women formed their own professional associations, including the Woman's Bar Association of the District of Columbia and the National Association of Women Lawyers.

After the VA told her they would never hire a woman lawyer for their legal department, she founded the law firm of Matthews, Berrien, and Greathouse with two other women attorneys, who were also National Woman's Party members and would remain in private practice of law from 1920 until her appointment to the federal bench in 1949.

Matthews worked closely with the suffragist National Woman's Party, serving as the organization's counsel starting in 1921. She represented the party in its effort to prevent condemnation of its Washington headquarters by the federal government; the land was condemned in order for the United States Supreme Court Building to be constructed on the site. Matthews successfully obtained the largest condemnation settlement awarded by the United States Government at the time, $299,200.

Additionally, Matthews was associate editor of the Women Lawyer's Journal from 1934 to 1935. She was a Professor of the Washington College of Law at American University in Washington, D.C. from 1933 to 1939 and from 1942 to 1948.

Federal judicial service

Matthews received a recess appointment from President Harry S. Truman on October 21, 1949, to the United States District Court for the District of Columbia, to a new seat created by 63 Stat. 493, becoming the first woman to serve on a United States District Court. She was nominated to the same seat by President Truman on January 5, 1950. She was confirmed by the United States Senate on April 4, 1950, and received her commission on April 7, 1950. She assumed senior status on March 1, 1968. Her service was terminated on April 25, 1988, due to her death in Washington, D.C.

Notable cases

Matthews heard several newsworthy cases, including the passport denial of actor Paul Robeson and the 1956 bribery trial of Jimmy Hoffa, prominent Teamster official.

See also
List of first women lawyers and judges in the United States
List of first women lawyers and judges in Washington D.C. (Federal District)

References

External links
 
 Burnita Shelton Matthews Papers.Schlesinger Library , Radcliffe Institute, Harvard University.

1894 births
1988 deaths
Judges of the United States District Court for the District of Columbia
United States district court judges appointed by Harry S. Truman
20th-century American judges
George Washington University Law School alumni
American suffragists
American women's rights activists
20th-century American lawyers
People from Claiborne County, Mississippi
Lawyers from Washington, D.C.
20th-century American women lawyers
20th-century American women judges
Equal Rights Amendment activists